Walking in the Air: The Greatest Ballads is a compilation album by the Finnish symphonic metal band Nightwish, released in 2011. It contains the "greatest ballads" from the first four albums, two of which are covers. The cover art was created by Andreas Marschall.

Track listing

Personnel

Tarja Turunen – Vocals
Tuomas Holopainen – Keyboards
Emppu Vuorinen – Lead guitar (all tracks), Acoustic guitar and Bass guitar (on tracks 2 and 13)
Sami Vänskä – Bass guitar (on tracks 1, 3, 4, 5, 6, 11, 12, 14)
Jukka Nevalainen – Drums and Percussion
Marko Hietala – Bass guitar (on tracks 7, 8, 9, 10, 15), male vocals (on track 7, 8)

Charts

References 

Nightwish albums
2011 compilation albums